Harriete Estel Berman (born 1952) is an American artist known for her sculptures and jewelry made from post-consumer, recycled household goods, and her satirical explorations of women's roles in society.

Early life and education 
Berman was born in Harrisburg, Pennsylvania.  She attended Syracuse University, and was granted a BFA in 1974. In 1980, she earned an MFA from Tyler School of Art, Temple University.

In 1990, she was the Artist in Residence at the Cranbrook Academy of Art.  She has also been a lecturer and teacher at California College of Arts & Crafts and Vermont College of Norwich University.

She currently lives and works in California.

Artistic career 

Selected solo exhibitions include "grass\ 'gras\" (2000) at the Wustum Museum (now Racine Art Museum), "The Family of Appliances You Can Believe In," at Sybaris Gallery (1999), and the Barbican Center in London (1998).

Recent work includes commentary on the prevalence of standardized testing of students, including Pick Up Your Pencils, Begin, a 12 x 28 foot curtain of pencils arranged in the form of a bell curve.

Since 2001 Harriete Estel Berman has worked to provide information for artists and makers about professional practices. These efforts include the Professional Guidelines, ASK Harriete and the SNAG Professional Development Seminar.

Collections
She has works in the permanent collections of the Detroit Institute of Arts, the Smithsonian American Art Museum, the Tyler School of Art, and The Jewish Museum, New York, Philadelphia Museum of Art, Minneapolis Institute of Arts, Crocker Art Museum, Museum of Arts and Design, Columbus Museum of Art, Jewish Museum, Berlin,  Germany, Museum of Fine Arts, Boston, National Ornamental Metal Museum,  Oakland Museum of California, Racine Art Museum, Yeshiva University Museum, and The Congregation Emanu-el.

Notes

External links 
Famous Selection, from "The Deceiver and the Deceived series", 1995-1996, in the collection of the Smithsonian American Art Museum

1952 births
Living people
20th-century American artists
20th-century American women artists
Artists from Harrisburg, Pennsylvania
California College of the Arts faculty
Syracuse University College of Visual and Performing Arts alumni
Temple University Tyler School of Art alumni
21st-century American artists
21st-century American women artists
American women academics